Weissach is a municipality in the district of Böblingen in Baden-Württemberg in Germany.

Weissach or Weißach may also refer to:

 Weissach im Tal, a municipality in the Rems-Murr-Kreis district of Baden-Württemberg, Germany
 Weißach (Bregenzer Ach), a river in the German and Austrian Alps, tributary of the Bregenzer Ach
 Weißach (Tegernsee), a river of Bavaria, Germany, tributary of the Tegernsee
 Weißach (Murr), a river of Baden-Württemberg, Germany, tributary of the Murr
 Weißach (Saalbach), a river of Baden-Württemberg, Germany, headstream of the Saalbach
 Weissach, a quarter of the town Kufstein, Austria
 Weissach axle, a special rear suspension arrangement devised for the Porsche 928
 Weissach Package, an option available for the Porsche 918 Spyder